Fort Madhogarh is located in Madhogarh Village, 42 km from Jaipur off the Jaipur - Agra highway (NH 11). Fort Madhogarh was built by Madho Singh Ji nearly 400 years ago and renovated and converted into a heritage hotel by Thakur Bhawani Singh Ji in July 2000.

History 
Maharaja Sawai Ram Singh II was married in Madhogarh family and gave Madhogarh  as a hereditary estate to Thakur Pratap Singh Ji a Rajput of Bhati clan. Fort Madhogarh is  400-year-old property build by Madho Singh who belongs to a Rajput of  Kachava Clan

In 2000, it was converted into a heritage hotel by the family of Thakur Bhawani Singh.

A historic fort linked to battle of Marathas in 1787. Overlooking the Tunga battlefield and a Rajasthani village inhabited by communities of artisans, it relieves the luxuries of yore in the restored and renovated apartments, including the Pratap Mahal suíte, which was once occupied by Maharaja Pratap Singh while leading the campaign, and deodhi phoola mahal

References 

 Heritage Hotel in Jaipur Homepage of Fort Madhogarh

Hotels in Rajasthan
Heritage hotels in India
Madhogarh